ŽNK Osijek is a Croatian women's football based in Osijek. It was founded in 1990 and is the most successful team in Croatian women's football with 23 Croatian championship titles. The 2010–11 title was won without dropping a single point in all of their 20 league games; last such success was in the season 2001–02. They also won the Croatian Women's Football Cup 19 times out of 30 editions.

Honours
Croatian First Division:
Winners (23): 1994 to 2003, 2007 to 2018, 2021
Runners-up (5): 1993, 2004, 2019, 2020, 2022
Croatian Cup:
Winners (19): 1995 to 2002, 2007 to 2017
Runners-up (6): 2003, 2004, 2006, 2019, 2021, 2022

Recent seasons

European record

Summary

By season

Record by country

Current squad

References

External links
ŽNK Osijek at UEFA.com

Women's football clubs in Croatia
Football clubs in Osijek-Baranja County
Association football clubs established in 1990
Sport in Osijek
1990 establishments in Croatia